Francis Nicholson Darke (October 25, 1863 – July 17, 1940) was a leading citizen of Regina, Saskatchewan and served as Mayor of Regina, Member of Parliament and as a prominent businessman.

He was born near Charlottetown, Prince Edward Island on his family's farm, remaining there until his late 20s when he decided to move to Western Canada.
He arrived in Regina in 1891 and settled there permanently after returning to PEI to marry.

He partnered with fellow islander Pople Balderson to raise livestock on a farm outside of Regina. Later, the two men purchased a butcher's shop in town and were soon able to obtain contracts with residential schools and the North-West Mounted Police.

Darke invested his earnings to purchase several blocks of land in town from the Canadian Pacific Railway. His real estate holdings were profitable enough to allow him to sell his cattle business in order to focus on land development.

He was elected to town council in 1895 and served as mayor in 1898 at the age of 35 and remains Regina's youngest ever mayor.

Darke was elected to the House of Commons of Canada in the 1925 federal election as a Liberal MP for Regina electoral district but resigned his seat in early 1926 in order to allow Saskatchewan Premier Charles Avery Dunning to enter the federal parliament in a by-election after he was appointed Finance Minister in the federal cabinet.

Darke donated $85,000 and raised a further $40,000 to help establish Regina College in 1910. The college eventually became the University of Regina. He also donated money in 1929 to build the  Darke Hall for Music and Art which served as the home of the Regina Symphony Orchestra for 41 years.

Darke Crescent, Darke Street, Darke Park and Darke Hall in Regina are named after him.

References

Darke, Francis Nicholson

1863 births
1940 deaths
Liberal Party of Canada MPs
Members of the House of Commons of Canada from Saskatchewan
Mayors of Regina, Saskatchewan
Canadian Methodists
Members of the United Church of Canada